Arviqtujuq Kangiqtua (Inuktitut syllabics: ᐊᕐᕕᖅᑐᔪᖅ ᑲᖏᖅᑐᐊ) formerly Eglinton Fiord is a fjord on Baffin Island's northeastern coast in the Qikiqtaaluk Region of Nunavut, Canada.

History
Arviqtujuq Kangiqtua was one of the traditional hunting areas of the Inuit. This fjord was visited by the Wordie Arctic Expedition in 1934.

Geography
Arviqtujuq Kangiqtua is located between Kangiqtualuk Uqquqti and Tasialuk fjords. The Esquimaux River flows into the eastern side of the fjord at Ravenscraig Harbour, to the northeast of the Cormack Arm, and the Cockscomb River discharges its waters into the southern end of the fjord.

The mouth of Arviqtujuq Kangiqtua mouth opens to Baffin Bay where the southern headland at the entrance is Eglinton Point.

In this area Atagulisaktalik to the west connects the inner reaches of the fjord through Ottawa Creek with Swiss Bay in Kangiqtualuk Uqquqti and the Ayr Pass connects with the Tasialuk fjord to the east.

See also
List of fjords in Canada

References

External links
Clyde River Proposed Territorial Park
SRN - Traversée Clyde - Pond en Terre de Baffin (in French)
Picture of Eglinton Tower. Caption "My last day trip on Baffin."

Bodies of water of Baffin Island
Fjords of Qikiqtaaluk Region